Mylvaganam Canagaratnam (15 April 1924 – 20 April 1980) was a Sri Lankan Tamil politician and Member of Parliament.

Canagaratnam stood as the Tamil United Liberation Front's candidate for Pottuvil at the 1977 parliamentary election. He came second and entered Parliament as the second member for Pottuvil. In December 1977, he defected to the United National Party-led government and was rewarded by being appointed District Minister for Batticaloa.

Canagaratnam was shot outside his home in Kollupitiya, Colombo on 24 January 1978. The attack was blamed on V. Prabhakaran and Uma Maheswaran of the militant Liberation Tigers of Tamil Eelam. He died of his injuries on 20 April 1980.

References

1924 births
1980 deaths
Assassinated Sri Lankan politicians
District ministers of Sri Lanka
Members of the 8th Parliament of Sri Lanka
People from Eastern Province, Sri Lanka
People killed during the Sri Lankan Civil War
People from British Ceylon
Sri Lankan Tamil politicians
Sri Lankan terrorism victims
Tamil United Liberation Front politicians
Terrorism deaths in Sri Lanka
United National Party politicians